Sungkyunkwan Scandal is a South Korean historical drama starring Park Yoo-chun, Park Min-young, Song Joong-ki, and Yoo Ah-in. Directed by Kim Won-seok and written by Kim Tae-hee, it is based on Jung Eun-gwol's bestselling 2007 novel The Lives of Sungkyunkwan Confucian Scholars. It aired on KBS2 from August 30 to November 2, 2010 on Mondays and Tuesdays at 21:55 for 20 episodes.

Synopsis
Set during an era when society does not allow females to be educated nor employed, Kim Yoon-hee (Park Min-young) disguises herself as her brother, Kim Yoon-shik, in order to make ends meet for her family. She goes through a series of odd jobs, mainly at a local bookstore, before she gets offered a chance to increase her earnings by becoming a substitute test-taker (an illegal act) for the upcoming entrance examination in the prestigious Sungkyunkwan, the Joseon Dynasty's highest educational institute. She gets caught by the upright Lee Sun-joon (Park Yoo-chun), who later acknowledges Yoon-hee's talents, and even encourages her to enroll in the university. There, she must bear with the endless mischief of upperclassman Gu Yong-ha (Song Joong-ki), put up with the constant mood swings of roommate Moon Jae-shin (Yoo Ah-in), avoid getting in trouble with the strict student body president Ha In-soo (Jun Tae-soo), and keep her secret from being discovered, all the while trying to hold her growing feelings for Lee Sun-joon at bay.

Together, Kim, Lee, Gu, and Moon form the "Jalgeum Quartet".

Cast

Main
Park Yoo-chun as Yi Seon-jun, nicknamed "Ga-rang"
Park Min-young as Kim Yun-hee (when girl)/Kim Yoon-shik (when boy), nicknamed "Dae-mul"
Bang Jun-seo as young Kim Yunhee
Song Joong-ki as Gu Yong-ha, nicknamed "Yeo-rim"
Yoo Ah-in as Mun Jae-sin, nicknamed "Geol-o"

Supporting
Jun Tae-soo as Ha In-su
Seo Hyo-rim as Ha Hyo-eun
Kim Min-seo as Jo-seon
Ahn Nae-sang as Jeong Yak-yong
Jo Sung-ha as King Jeongjo of Joseon
Kim Kap-soo as Yi Jeong-mu, second state councillor and Seon-jun's father
Lee Jae-yong as Ha U-gyu, minister of military affairs and In-su's father

Extended

Kang Sung-pil as Im Byung-choon
Ji Nam-hyuk as Seol Go-bong
Chae Byung-chan as Kang-moo
Kim Ik-tae as Chae Je-gong, chief state councillor
Choi Dong-joon as Moon Geun-soo, minister of Saheonbu and Jae-shin's Father
Kim Kwang-kyu as Hwang-ga
Kim Ha-kyoon as Choi Shin-mook
Park Geun-soo as Yoo Chang-ik
Kim Young-bae as Go Jang-bok
Kim Jung-kyoon as Ahn Do-hyun
Jang Se-hyun as Kim Woo-tak
Hwang Chan-woo as Bae Hae-won
Im Young-pil as Ham Choon-ho
Joo Ah-sung as Nam Myung-shik
Kim Mi-kyung as Ms. Jo, Yoon-hee's mother
Ha Min-jae as Kim Yoon Shik, Yoon-hee' younger brother
Ryu Dam as Soon-dol
Sung Hyun-joo as Beo-deul
Im Yoon-jung as Aeng-aeng
Jung Hye-mi as Seom-seom
Park Dong-bin as Woo-kyu's steward
Jo Yi-sam as Soron Yusaeng
Bae Jae-ho as Soron Yusaeng
Eom Bo-yong as Cheon-dong
Kim Dan-yool as Bok-dong
Lee Tae-ri as Bok-soo, Bok-dong's elder brother
Oh Na-mi as Mi-hyun, Hyo-eun's friend
Ahn Nam-hee as Jung-hyun, Hyo-eun's friend
Nam Myung-ryul as Kim Seung-heon, Yoon-hee's Father

Cameos
Lee In as Park Dal-jae (episode 1)
Lee Won-jong as Shaman (episode 8)
Park Chul-min as Yoon Hyung-gu (episode 9, 17~18)
Ki Im-beom as Song Yong-tae (episode 9~10)
Lee Dal-hyung as Yong-ha's father (episode 17~18)

Notes

Reception
The series attracted a fervent fanbase that belied its modest mid-teen ratings. Its cult popularity was manifested in the very high online activity on the message boards of its official website and in popular portal DC Inside, the number of episode viewings on the KBS website, as well as units of DVDs and OST albums sold. The original soundtrack, which featured Park Yoo-chun's band JYJ, sold 110,000 copies in a couple of weeks. The old campus of Sungkyunkwan University (SKKU) was the setting for the fusion historical drama, which also starred alumnus Song Joong-ki, resulting in increased interest in SKKU from international audiences who watched the drama.

Ratings

Awards and nominations

Theatrical versions
The series was edited into a theatrical version which screened in Japanese cinemas from May 6–19, 2011 as part of the "Dokimeki☆Ikemen Festival."

For the drama's first anniversary, Korean cable channel QTV (a joint venture between Turner Broadcasting System and JoongAng Ilbo's affiliate, IS Plus) re-edited the series into a two-hour TV movie which aired on September 10, 2011.

References

External links 

  
 
 
 

Korean Broadcasting System television dramas
South Korean historical television series
Television series set in the Joseon dynasty
2010 South Korean television series debuts
2010 South Korean television series endings
Korean-language television shows
Television series by C-JeS Entertainment
Television shows based on South Korean novels
Television series by RaemongRaein
South Korean television series remade in other languages